Inverlussa is a hamlet  southwest of Ardlussa and 14 miles from Craighouse at the mouth of Lussa River on the east coast of the island of Jura, in the council area of Argyll and Bute, Scotland. It is largely a linear settlement.

History 
The name "Inverlussa" is Gaelic/Norse and means "The mouth of the bright river".

Landmarks
Historically there was a small chapel at Inverlussa.

References 

Hamlets in Argyll and Bute
Villages on Jura, Scotland